Mătăcina may refer to several villages in Romania:

 Mătăcina, in Vințu de Jos Commune, Alba County
 Mătăcina, in Valea Sării Commune, Vrancea County